Ventnor is a rural locality in the North Burnett Region, Queensland, Australia.

History 
Yarrol Road State School opened on 3 June 1946. In 1948 it became Ventnor State School. It closed in 1960.

Heritage listings 
Ventnor has a number of heritage-listed sites, including:
 Yarrol Road: Ventnor State School

References 

North Burnett Region
Localities in Queensland